Kim Sang-wook (born 21 April 1988 in Seoul) is a South Korea professional ice hockey left winger who plays for Anyang Halla. Internationally he has played for the South Korean national team at the junior and senior levels, and participated at the 2018 Winter Olympics.

References

External links
 

1988 births
HL Anyang players
Asian Games bronze medalists for South Korea
Asian Games medalists in ice hockey
Asian Games silver medalists for South Korea
Ice hockey players at the 2011 Asian Winter Games
Ice hockey players at the 2017 Asian Winter Games
Ice hockey players at the 2018 Winter Olympics
Ice hockey people from Seoul
Living people
Olympic ice hockey players of South Korea
Medalists at the 2011 Asian Winter Games
Medalists at the 2017 Asian Winter Games
South Korean ice hockey left wingers
Yonsei University alumni